The year 1896 in archaeology involved some significant events.

Explorations

Excavations
 Bernard Grenfell and Arthur Hunt of Queen's College, Oxford, begin excavation at Oxyrhynchus, Egypt, discovering New Testament texts amongst the Oxyrhynchus Papyri.
 Richard Wetherill begins excavating Chaco Canyon.
 George H. Pepper from the American Museum of Natural History leads the Hyde Exploring Expedition in excavating Pueblo Bonito (ending 1899).
 A. S. Murray of the British Museum begins excavating Enkomi, Cyprus.
 Society of Antiquaries of Scotland begins excavating Ardoch Roman Fort.

Publications
 Sousa Viterbo - Archeologia industrial Portuguesa: Os moinhos. O Archeologo Português II(8/9): 193-204 (Aug./Sept.)

Finds
 February - Broighter Gold found by farmer, Tom Nicholl.
 December 1 - Archaeologist Alois Anton Führer, Nepalese General Khadga Samsher Rana and an expedition rediscover the great stone pillar of Ashoka at Lumbini, traditionally the spot of the birthplace of Gautama Buddha, after using Faxian's records.
 Charioteer of Delphi found at the Temple of Apollo at Delphi by French excavators.
 Madaba Map.
 Flinders Petrie discovers the Merneptah Stele at Luxor Temple

Awards

Miscellaneous
 April 6 - The opening ceremonies of the 1896 Summer Olympics, the first modern Olympic Games, are held at the Panathenaic Stadium in Athens.
 April 16 - The National Trust for Places of Historic Interest or Natural Beauty in England acquires its first building for preservation, Alfriston Clergy House, a 14th-century Wealden hall house.

Births
 July 12 - Li Ji, Chinese archaeologist (d. 1979)

Deaths
 January 28 - Giuseppe Fiorelli, Italian archaeologist of Pompeii (b. 1823)
 February 24 - Mariano Armellini, Italian archaeologist of early Christian Rome (b. 1852)
 April 12 - Carl Humann, German archaeologist (b. 1839)
 June 10 - John Henry Middleton, English archaeologist (b. 1846)
 July 11 - Ernst Curtius, German archaeologist (b. 1814)
 December 17 - Charles Edwin Wilbour, American Egyptologist and writer (b. 1833)

References

Archaeology, 1896 In
Archaeology by year
1890s in science
Archaeology, 1896 In